Helga Luber is a former East German slalom canoeist who competed in the 1960s.

She won a gold medal in the K-1 team event at the 1967 ICF Canoe Slalom World Championships in Lipno.

References
Overview of athlete's results at canoeslalom.net 

East German female canoeists
Possibly living people
Year of birth missing (living people)
Medalists at the ICF Canoe Slalom World Championships